A hyperpower is a state that dominates all other states in every domain (i.e., military, culture, economy, etc.); it has no rivals that can match its capabilities, considered to be a step higher than a superpower.

Although the United States has arguably exhibited the traits of a hyperpower in the post-Cold War era, its global influence has begun to decline relative to other potential superpowers. More specifically, the United States, as a  global power, no longer dominates in every domain (i.e., military, culture, economy, technology, diplomatic) in every region of the world. However, the United States is at the top of the list in each category on the global scale, which means that while there are some regions in which the United States doesn't have the most influence, the United States has the most impact in each category on the global scale.

History
The British journalist Peregrine Worsthorne coined the term in a Sunday Telegraph article published March 3, 1991. After the end of the Cold War with the dissolution of the Soviet Union, some political commentators felt that a new term needed to describe the United States' position as the lone superpower. French foreign minister Hubert Védrine popularized the term in 1998, because from France's position, the United States looked like a hyperpower, although the validity of classifying the United States in this way was disputed.

The term has also been applied retroactively to dominant states of the past. In her book Day of Empire, American professor Amy Chua suggests that the Achaemenid Empire, the Tang dynasty, the Roman Empire, the Mongol Empire, the Dutch Empire, and the British Empire were successful examples of historical hegemons; the Spanish Monarchy, Greater East Asia Co-Prosperity Sphere, and Third Reich were countered. She reflects on assertions that the United States is a modern hyperpower. In a historical context, it is usually understood to mean a power that greatly exceeds any others in its political environment along several axes; Rome did not dominate Persia, Ancient India or China, but did defeat the entire Mediterranean area militarily, culturally, and economically.

See also

 Emerging power
 Great power
 List of modern great powers
 Middle power
 Second superpower
 Small power

References 

Military terminology
Political terminology
Types of countries
1990s neologisms